Wantabadgery is a village community in the central eastern part of the Riverina situated about 35 kilometres east of Wagga Wagga and 19 kilometres west of Nangus.

Wanta Badgery Post Office opened on 1 December 1923 and closed in 1966.

Wantabadgery was formerly an Aboriginal Mission. It is now a small Village along the Murrumbidgee River, New South Wales.

Gallery

References

External links

Towns in the Riverina
Towns in New South Wales
Populated places on the Murrumbidgee River
Junee Shire